Linsk may refer to:
Lesko in Subcarpathian Voivodeship 
Lińsk in Kuyavian-Pomeranian Voivodeship
A synonym for Ropshitz (Hasidic dynasty), a Hasidic dynasty founded by Rabbi Naftali Tzvi Horowitz, son of Rabbi Menachem Mendel of Linsk
Linsk (Hasidic dynasty), a Hasidic dynasty founded by Rabbi Avraham Chaim Horowitz of Linsk, a branch of the Ropshitz dynasty